Eleonara Amalia Maria Adelborg (December 6, 1849 – April 23, 1940) was a Swedish textile artist. She is best known for preserving Swedish textile art traditions. Her works include the carpet in the Birgitta Chapel in Rome and the chasubles for the Sofia Church in Stockholm.

Biography 
Between 1886 and 1899, she worked for the Swedish Art Exhibition created by Selma Giöbel and in 1900 she worked for the Friends of Handicraft. In 1907, she retired from HV and lived with her sisters, Ottilia Adelborg and Gertrud Adelborg in Gagnef. She was a member of the women's association Nya Idun, joining in 1888.

References

Further reading  
 

1849 births
1940 deaths
People from Gagnef Municipality
Swedish textile artists
Swedish women artists
19th-century women textile artists
19th-century textile artists
20th-century textile artists
Members of Nya Idun